Milton Russell Graham  (born July 28, 1934) was an American and Canadian football player who played for the Ottawa Rough Riders. He won the Grey Cup with Ottawa in 1960. Graham played college football at Colgate University and was drafted in the 1956 NFL draft by the Chicago Bears (Round 14, #167). He also played basketball at Colgate, after which he was also drafted in the 13th round of the 1956 NBA draft by the Syracuse Nationals (now Philadelphia 76ers), but focused on football instead. He later played in American Football League for the Boston Patriots.

References

1934 births
Ottawa Rough Riders players
Living people
Colgate Raiders football players
Boston Patriots players
People from Chatham, Massachusetts
Sportspeople from Barnstable County, Massachusetts
Players of American football from Massachusetts
American Football League players
Colgate Raiders men's basketball players
Syracuse Nationals draft picks
American men's basketball players